Fuji is a Japanese surname. Notable people with the surname include:

 Ari Fuji, first woman pilot-in-command at a Japanese airliner
 Keiko Fuji, Japanese singer of the 1960s and 1970s, and mother of Hikaru Utada
, Japanese footballer
 Sumiko Fuji, Japanese actress
 Takako Fuji, Japanese actress
 Takeshi Fuji, American former professional boxer
, Japanese footballer

Fictional characters
 Shusuke Fuji, a character in the anime and manga The Prince of Tennis
 Chihiro Fuji, a character in the Inazuma Eleven
 Fuji Hakayito, Super Dave Osborne's assistant in Super Dave (TV series)

See also
 Fujii (disambiguation)
 Fuji (disambiguation)

Japanese-language surnames